The catty is a traditional Chinese unit of mass.

Catty may also be:
 the nickname of Catasauqua, Pennsylvania, a borough in the US
 an informal term for a catapult
 an adjective meaning either:
pertaining to cats
characterised by spiteful behaviour (see passive aggressiveness)
 Catty Nebulart, a character in the anime metaseries Gall Force

See also 
 Katty (disambiguation)
 Catti
 Catie
 Kati (disambiguation)